The FIBA Oceania Championship for Men 2003 was the qualifying tournament of FIBA Oceania for the 2004 Summer Olympics. Australia won all three games to qualify for the Oceanic spot in the Olympics.

Teams that did not enter

Venues

Results

References
FIBA Archive

FIBA Oceania Championship
Championship
2003 in New Zealand basketball
2003–04 in Australian basketball
International basketball competitions hosted by Australia
Australia men's national basketball team games
New Zealand men's national basketball team games
Basketball in Victoria (Australia)